Otsquago Creek is a river that enters the Mohawk River in Fort Plain, New York.  is a Mohawk Indian word meaning 'under the bridge,' probably referring to an early bridge of felled trees along the creek, a way of making small bridges.

The source of the Otsquago Creek is about 12 miles southeast from its outlet, 1,360 feet above sea level and about 1,000 feet above the Mohawk River, in a marshy field by Van Hornesville, New York. Creamery Falls and Van Hornesville Falls are two waterfalls on the creek near Van Hornesville.

History
Before European colonization, the Iroquois Indians occupied the area around the creek. Many Indian villages were built along the creek. One of these villages was called Otstungo and is located on a triangular piece of land between the Otstungo Creek and Otsquago Creek, by the mouth of Otstungo Creek. The village was only accessed from the south side due to steep cliffs on the other sides. Many stone axes, pestles, arrowheads, spears, bone implements and pipes have been excavated at this village.

John Concuponk was an Oneida Indian who lived in his wigwam along the creek by Starkville with his wife Canadalacadoa. Upon his death he was buried on the hill behind his wigwam. Then Peter P. Murphy, who was the resident physician in Southville, removed Concuponk's body for his students to study. His wife soon found out what had happened, she attempted to murder the doctor. After she tried this, she was taken to the reservation in Oneida.

In 1794, Mr. VanHorne opened a store in present-day Van Hornesville. By 1800, there was a cloth fulling and finishing mill on the creek. By 1814, there was a carding mill, saw mill, fulling mill, and clover hulling mill in operation halfway between Van Hornesville and Southville. In 1836, Elias Braman and Company built a cotton mill on the creek by Van Hornseville.

Watershed
The Otsquago Creek's  watershed accounts for 1.77% of the total Mohawk River watershed. Where the creek rises, it is located in the Town of Stark and the lower half is in the Town of Minden. Within the watershed, the majority of the land is open space, with roughly one third (33.9%) being forested land. The upper part of the watershed is a mix of rural residential, agriculture land, and several small hamlets including Vanhornesville and Stark. Then in the lower part of the watershed, residential and commercial uses mostly in Village of Fort Plain.

The creek has an average slope of 1.5% throughout its entire length. The upper creek has a slope of 3% from the source to the Hamlet of Starkville, then from there downstream has a slope of .8%.

Hydrology

Discharge

The station was in operation from October 1949 to September 1989 and then from July 2014 to now. The flood in June 2013 prompted the stream gauge to be reinstalled.

Flooding
Flooding has occurred numerous times on most of the creek, with major damage in the hamlets of Van Hornesville, Starkville and Hallsville, and in the Village of Fort Plain. Flooding is caused in part due to large amounts of coarse sediment being carried downstream from the upper creek during large floods are deposited further downstream and clog bridges.

According to FEMA on September 22, 1938, October 2, 1945, October 17, 1955 and March 11, 1976 there were major floods along the creek. On March 5, 1979, an ice jamming caused the Mohawk River and Otsquago Creek to overflow and caused extensive damage in the Village of Fort Plain. Floodwaters were reported to be four feet deep in the on River Street and Hancock Street in the village. The flooding receded after the washout of the aqueduct on the creek by State Route 5S. Another severe storm caused catastrophic flooding along the Otsquago Creek between June 26 and June 29, 2006. 

Then in mid to late June 2013, severe flooding was experienced along the entire creek. The flood of 2013 flooded downtown Fort Plain and extended all the way up the creek to Van Hornesville. Police officers who were knocking on doors when the water was rising got cut off. Resients were unable to get off Abbott Street, which is a dead end road, and escaped up a small hill on the opposite side of creek. A culvert was damaged on Chyle Road and the Owen D. Young Central School was damaged in Van Hornesville. Part of State Route 80 between Van Hornesville and Starkville was entirely washed out. Large amounts of sediment were also carried downstream and deposited which caused flooding to be worse. One fatality was reported in this storm. On July 3, 2013, Senator Charles E. Schumer visited the area and called for quick action from the federal government. A mix of NYSDOT crews, a half-dozen contractors and the National Guard worked to restore the stream bed and roads. In mid July, at the restoration project's peak, there were more than 300 workers on the project.

On February 25, 2017, at around 6:15 pm, 625 residents were told to evacuate as the flood warning siren was activated because of quickly rising waters. After a short time, around 9:30 pm, residents were told it was safe to go home. No major damage occurred during this flood, only a few trees and wires were knocked down and minor stream bank erosion occurred.

Fishing
Fish species present in the creek are brook trout, brown trout and rainbow trout. In 2019 there were 270  brown trout released into the creek in the Town of Minden, and 350  brown trout and 1000  rainbow trout in the Town of Stark.

Conservation and management
In 2015, Dominion energy proposed to expand the compressor station at Brookmans Corners, located near the banks of the creek. Concerns were brought up about the pollution that would be caused, at an estimated 96,683 tons of greenhouse gas emissions would be put into the air every year. These concerns are compounded by Otsquago Creek and the particular topography of the Otsquago valley that limits the dispersion of emissions.

The Robert B. Woodruff Outdoor Learning Center was built and opened in the summer of 1984 and consists of  within the Otsquago gorge. It is located at the site of an 18th century trail, which became the road between Fort Plain and Cooperstown in the 19th century. After the trails were built in 1984, it provided better access to the numerous waterfalls in the gorge as well as the limestone caves.

The Young family partnered with Otsego Land Trust to conserve about  bordering the creek by Van Hornesville, to protect the village's water supply. Another  was later donated as well to further protect the community's water supply.

See also
List of rivers of New York

References 

Rivers of New York (state)
Rivers of Montgomery County, New York
Rivers of Herkimer County, New York
Mohawk River